This is a list of telephone area codes in the state of Nebraska.308: Western Nebraska, including Grand Island and Kearney402/531''': Eastern Nebraska, including Omaha and Lincoln, overlaid in 2011

Under the original North American Numbering Plan of 1947, area code 402 covered all of Nebraska. Area code 308 was split off in 1954, and Nebraska retained the same area code configuration for 57 years until the 402/531 overlay, making it one of the longest-lasting in the numbering plan.

References

External links

Nebraska
Area codes